The Rotorua Museum Te Whare Taonga o Te Arawa is a local museum and art gallery in the Government Gardens near the centre of Rotorua, New Zealand.

The museum is housed in the former Bath House building which was opened in 1908 and is noted as the first major investment in the New Zealand tourism industry by the government. The Bath House is a half-timbered building that has been called the most impressive Elizabethan Revival building in New Zealand.

The museum is currently closed as of 18 November 2016 due to not meeting stringent New Zealand earthquake standards and will remain so for the foreseeable future.

Rotorua Museum opened in the south wing of the Bath House in 1969; Rotorua Art Gallery opened in the north wing in 1977. In 1988, the museum and gallery combined to form the Rotorua Museum of Art and History.

The museum is run by the Rotorua District Council. It has collections covering fine arts, photography, social history, and Taonga objects from the Māori culture.

Geothermal bathing in Rotorua 
Early Māori in the area the iwi of Te Arawa had utilised the natural geothermal features since arriving in the early 1300s, the area was also abundant in lakes, rivers and streams.

Gallery

References

Further reading

External links 

 Official Rotorua Museum website

Museums established in 1988
Local museums in New Zealand
Art museums and galleries in New Zealand
City museums in New Zealand
Museum of Art and History
Former public baths
1988 establishments in New Zealand
Museums in the Bay of Plenty Region
Terminating vistas in New Zealand
1900s architecture in New Zealand
Heritage New Zealand Category 1 historic places in the Bay of Plenty Region
Tourist attractions in Rotorua